NMP-7 is a drug which acts as both a non-selective agonist of the CB1 and CB2 cannabinoid receptors, and also as a blocker of T-type calcium channels, the target of anticonvulsant drugs such as ethosuximide. NMP-7 has an agonist EC50 of 96.9nM at CB1 and 10.5nM at CB2, and an IC50 of 1.84μM for blocking Cav3.2 T-type calcium channels. In animal studies it produces potent analgesic effects in a variety of different tests.

See also
 CUMYL-PEGACLONE
 EG-018

References

Cannabinoids
Carbazoles